Nizar Hamed Mahrous (12 March 1963), known as Abu Hamed, is a Syrian football manager and former player who is the head coach of Erbil.

Managerial career
In May 2011, Mahrous was appointed manager of the Syria national team. On 24 August 2011, he quit after FIFA disqualified Syria from 2014 World Cup qualifying for fielding an ineligible player.

On 7 July 2021, Mahrous returned as head coach of the Syria national team, ahead of the third round of qualification for the 2022 FIFA World Cup.

Statistics

Honours

As a Manager
Al-Jaish SC
Syrian Cup winner: 1996–97

Al-Wahda SC
Syrian League 1st Division winner: 1997–98

Al-Jaish SC
Syrian Premier League winner: 2000–01

Shabab Al-Ordon SC
Jordanian Pro League winner: 2005–06
Jordan FA Cup winner: 2005–06
Jordan FA Cup winner: 2006–07
Jordan Shield Cup winner: 2006–07
AFC Cup winner: 2007–08
Jordan Super Cup winner: 2007–08

Erbil SC
Iraqi Premier League winner: 2011–12
AFC Cup runner-up: 2011–12

Al-Jazeera SC
Jordanian Pro League runner-up: 2016–17
Jordan FA Cup runner-up: 2016–17
Jordan Super Cup runner-up: 2017–18
Jordan Shield Cup runner-up: 2017–18

Al Ansar FC
Lebanese Elite Cup runner-up: 2019–20

References

External links
 

1963 births
Living people
Syrian footballers
Sportspeople from Damascus
Association football forwards
Al-Wahda SC (Syria) players
Al-Jaish Damascus players
Tishreen SC players
Saham SC players
Syrian Premier League players
Oman Professional League players
Syria international footballers
Competitors at the 1987 Mediterranean Games
Mediterranean Games gold medalists for Syria
Mediterranean Games medalists in football
1988 AFC Asian Cup players
Syrian football managers
Al-Wahda SC (Syria) managers
Al-Jaish Damascus managers
Al-Hazm FC managers
Safa SC managers
Al-Baqa'a Club managers
Syria national football team managers
Al Ahed FC managers
Shabab Al-Ordon Club managers
Al-Faisaly SC managers
Erbil SC managers
Najran SC managers
That Ras Club managers
AC Tripoli managers
Al-Jazeera (Jordan) managers
Hatta Club managers
Emirates Club managers
Al Ansar FC managers
Syrian Premier League managers
Lebanese Premier League managers
Saudi First Division League managers
Jordanian Pro League managers
Iraqi Premier League managers
Saudi Professional League managers
UAE First Division League managers
Syrian expatriate footballers
Syrian expatriate sportspeople in Oman
Expatriate footballers in Oman
Syrian expatriate football managers
Expatriate football managers in Lebanon
Expatriate football managers in Saudi Arabia
Expatriate football managers in Jordan
Expatriate football managers in Iraq
Expatriate football managers in the United Arab Emirates
Syrian expatriate sportspeople in Lebanon
Syrian expatriate sportspeople in Saudi Arabia
Syrian expatriate sportspeople in Jordan
Syrian expatriate sportspeople in Iraq
Syrian expatriate sportspeople in the United Arab Emirates
AFC Cup winning managers